Sheikha Ahmed al-Mahmoud (died 29 January 2020) was appointed the first woman member of the Qatari cabinet in 2003. She became the Minister of Education, a post she held till 2009. She died on 29 January 2020.

Early life
Al-Mahmoud was the daughter of Ahmad bin Abdullah Al Mahmoud. She held a Bachelor of Arts degree in Arabic literature.

Career
Her career began in 1970 when she became a school teacher. Apart from teaching, Al-Mahmoud has served as a secondary school's principal, member of Committee for revising elementary education methods. In 1996, she became the first woman Deputy Assistant Minister of education in Qatar. She was also appointed an Under secretary in the Ministry of Culture, Cultivation and Education. She retained the post till May 2003, when the Emir of Qatar Sheikh Hamad bin Khalifa Al Thani made her the Minister of Education; the first Qatari women to hold a cabinet post and the second in Gulf region to do so.

Al-Mahmoud was made the Secretary General of Qatar's Supreme Education Council in May 2006. In 2009, Saad bin Ibrahim Al-Mahmoud succeeded her as the Minister of Education.

Personal life
Al-Mahmoud had two daughters and two sons.

References

2020 deaths
Women government ministers of Qatar
Place of death missing
Year of birth missing
Place of birth missing
Education ministers
Women school principals and headteachers
21st-century women politicians